Hohman Avenue Commercial Historic District is a national historic district located at Hammond, Lake County, Indiana.   The district encompasses 15 contributing buildings in the central business district of Hammond. It developed between about 1904 and 1956, and includes notable example of Romanesque Revival, Classical Revival, and Colonial Revival style architecture.  Notable buildings include Knott's Apartments (1904), Emmerling Ambulance Garage (1918), Emmerling Building (1918), St. Joseph's Roman Catholic Church Complex (Church, 1912–1914; Rectory, c. 1915; Hall, 1956), LaSalle Hotel (aka Hotel Mee, 1908), OK Building (1913), and the Hammond National Bank (aka Ruff Building, 1911).

It was listed in the National Register of Historic Places in 2011.

References

Historic districts on the National Register of Historic Places in Indiana
Neoclassical architecture in Indiana
Colonial Revival architecture in Indiana
Romanesque Revival architecture in Indiana
Historic districts in Hammond, Indiana
National Register of Historic Places in Lake County, Indiana